Hugo Mayer (January 1, 1899 – August 22, 1968) was a German politician of the Christian Democratic Union (CDU) and former member of the German Bundestag.

Life 
In the first and second legislative periods (1949-1957), he represented the Bad Kreuznach / Birkenfeld constituency in the Bundestag as a directly elected member. During both terms of office he was a full member of the Committee on Petitions. In the first term of office he was also a full member of the Committee for Social Policy.

Literature

References

1899 births
1968 deaths
Members of the Bundestag for Rhineland-Palatinate
Members of the Bundestag 1953–1957
Members of the Bundestag 1949–1953
Members of the Bundestag for the Christian Democratic Union of Germany